WARU (1600 AM) was a radio station broadcasting an oldies format. The station is licensed to Peru, Indiana, United States.  The station was last owned by Dream Weaver Marketing, LLC. Its license was deleted on September 30, 2021.

Technical
An Harris model SX-1A all solid state transmitter (featuring their patented "Polyphase" pulse duration modulator) fed a T-match network that provided impedance matching into a slant wire fed quarter wave monopole that was grounded at its base.  A slant wire feed is an old grand-fathered (now obsolete) method that made it easier to install additional antennas on the tower without the need for the costly base insulator or isocouplers.

References

External links
FCC Station Search Details: DWARU (Facility ID: 71276)
FCC History Cards for WARU (covering 1953-1979)

ARU
Radio stations established in 1954
Radio stations disestablished in 2021
Defunct radio stations in the United States
ARU
1954 establishments in Indiana
2021 disestablishments in Indiana